The term zygoma generally refers to the zygomatic bone, a bone of the human skull commonly referred to as the cheekbone or malar bone, but it may also refer to:

 The zygomatic arch, a structure in the human skull formed primarily by parts of the zygomatic bone and the temporal bone
 The zygomatic process, a bony protrusion of the human skull, mostly composed of the zygomatic bone but also contributed to by the frontal bone, temporal bone, and maxilla

See also
Zygoma reduction plasty

Anatomy